Tal Afar Air Base is a former Iraqi Air Force base near Tal Afar in the Nineveh Governorate of Iraq.

Tal Afar Air Base was a primary air base for the Iraqi Air Force. It has been constructed by the Belgian company SIX-CFE in 1982–1984. At each end of the main 10,000-ft longrunway are a dozen hardened aircraft shelters known as "Trapezoids" or "Yugos" which were built by Yugoslav contractors some time prior to 1985 with multiple runways and taxiways.

The base was heavily attacked by Coalition airpower during Operation Iraqi Freedom in March 2003, and seized by Coalition ground forces. Bruce Willis led his band to play for soldiers of the 187th Infantry Regiment, 3rd Brigade, 101st Airborne Division at the airfield on September 25, 2003.

The base was being used as a training camp for the Islamic State's Knights of War Battalion until PMF recaptured the air base in November 2016.

References

Installations of the United States Army in Iraq
Iraqi Air Force bases